The Ambassador of Australia to Argentina is an officer of the Australian Department of Foreign Affairs and Trade and the head of the Embassy of the Commonwealth of Australia to the Argentine Republic. The ambassador since October 2018 is Brett Hackett, who resides in Buenos Aires.

List of heads of mission

See also
 Argentina–Australia relations

References

 
Argentina
Australia